The European Hot Air Balloon Championships are the FAI European Hot Air Balloon Championship and the FAI Women's European Hot Air Balloon Championship. These biennial events for hot air ballooning are conducted under the direction of the FAI Ballooning Commission (CIA or Comité International d'Aérostation).

FAI European Hot Air Balloon Championship

FAI Women's European Hot Air Balloon Championship

See also 
 World Hot Air Ballooning Championships
 World Junior Hot Air Ballooning Championships

References

External links 
 FAI Ballooning Commission (CIA)
 20th FAI European Hot Air Balloon Championship
 4th FAI Women's European Hot Air Balloon Championship

European championships
Ballooning competitions
1976 establishments in Europe
Recurring sporting events established in 1976